There are several prefixes in the Hebrew language which are appended to regular words to introduce a new meaning. In Hebrew, the letters that form those prefixes are called "formative letters" (Hebrew: אוֹתִיּוֹת הַשִּׁמּוּשׁ, Otiyot HaShimush). Eleven of the twenty-two letters of the Hebrew alphabet are considered Otiyot HaShimush. These letters are Aleph (א), Bet (ב), He (ה), Vav (ו), Yud (י), Kaf (כ), Lamed (ל), Mem (מ), Nun (נ), Shin (ש), and Tav (ת). A mnemonic to remember these letters is איתן משה וכלב (Eitan, Moshe, v'Kalev), which translates to "Ethan, Moses, and Caleb."

Otiyot HaShimush 
Prefixes in Hebrew serve multiple purposes. A prefix can serve as a conjunction, preposition, definite article, or interrogative. Prefixes are also used when conjugating verbs in the future tense and for various other purposes.

Conjunctions

Inseparable prepositions

Other prepositions

Definite article

Interrogative

Conjugation of verbs

Other uses

Non Otiyot HaShimush
European languages had a large stock of prefixes for technical terminology mostly taken from Greek and Latin. While Hebrew traditionally did not use this kind of prefixes, professionals in the Yishuv who started to teach and work in Hebrew were used to this terminology, and incorporated most of these prefixes into Hebrew. Meanwhile people working on revitalising the language coined some Hebrew parallels, so today those foreign and Hebrew prefixes are used interchangeably.

See also
 Affix
 Hebrew grammar
 Hebrew verb conjugation
 Prefix
 Preposition
 Suffixes in Hebrew

References

External links
 Hebrew Language: Root Words

Hebrew grammar
Prefixes